Seleksi Bersama Masuk Perguruan Tinggi Negeri or SBMPTN (Joint Entrance Selection of State Universities), is an Indonesian college entrance system for admission of new students in state universities using written examinations nationally, which has various advantages, both for college applicants, public universities, as well as national interests. For college applicants, written exams are very profitable because they are more efficient, cheaper, and flexible due to cross-regional mechanisms.

SBMPTN is managed by Lembaga Tes Masuk Perguruan Tinggi or LTMPT (Agency of University Entrance Tests), an agency under the Ministry of Education, Culture, Research, and Technology.

History 
Based on its history, the beginning of SBMPTN implementation starts from the implementation of Seleksi Nasional Masuk Perguruan Tinggi Negeri (SNMPTN, Joint National Selection of State Universities) through written test (SNMPTN Tulis) held in 2008. At that time, SNMPTN is organized by Dirjen Dikti Kemendikbud (Directorate General of Higher Education of Ministry of Education and Culture). However, starting in 2013 the tests is submitted to the Majelis Rektor Perguruan Tinggi Negeri Indonesia (MRPTNI, Rectors Assembly of State Universities of Indonesia). Based on the very long experience in executing the selection of new admissions through written examination, in 2013, MRPTNI held a written test as one form of admission to PTN in addition to SNMPTN. This test put forward the principle of trust and togetherness is called Seleksi Bersama Masuk Perguruan Tinggi Negeri (SBMPTN).

Written exams use test questions developed in such way that meet the requirements for validity, difficulty level, and sufficient distinguishing features. The written exam of SBMPTN is designed to measure the general capabilities that allegedly determine the success of prospective students in all courses, namely higher-order thinking, which includes academic potential, mastery of basic subject areas: the field of Saintek (Sains dan Teknologi, Science and Technology) or Soshum (Sosial dan Humaniora, Social and Humanities) fields. In addition to taking a written exam, participants who choose the course of Arts and/or Sports are required to take a skill exam.

Participating universities
The number of state universities incorporated into SBMPTN for the first time in 2013 is as much as 62 state universities and by 2015 it is estimated to increase to 77 state universities. This is caused by the number of new colleges and Islamic universities, which previously was in the Ministry of Religious Affairs then delegated to the Ministry of Research, Technology and Higher Education.

Exam 
Examination in SBMPTN is called Ujian Tes Berbasis Komputer (UTBK) or "computer-based written test"

Type of exam

Written exam 
 Tes Potensi Skolastik (TPS, Scholastic Aptitude Test) that consists of:
 Kemampuan Penalaran Umum (Logical Reasoning Ability)
 Kemampuan Kuantitatif (Quantitative Ability)
 Pengetahuan dan Pemahaman Umum (General Comprehension and Knowledge)
 Kemampuan Memahami Bacaan dan Menulis (Reading and Writing Comprehension Ability)
 Tes Kemampuan Bahasa Inggris (TKBI, English Ability Test) consists of English in high-academic level
 Tes Kemampuan Akademik (TKA, Test of Academic Ability) that vary by discipline:
 TKA Sains dan Teknologi (Test of Academic Ability for Natural Science and Technology) that consists of: Mathematics, Physics, Biology, and Chemistry
 TKA Sosial dan Humaniora (Test of Academic Ability for Social Science and Humanities) that consists of: Sociology, Economics, Geography, and History
 TKA Campuran (Test of Academic Ability for Mixed Discipline) that combined both TKA Saintek and TKA Soshum

Skills exam 
 Skills examination is for those who interested in Arts and Sport Science Program.
 The Arts Skills Exam consists of a test of knowledge and skills in the field of arts.
 The Sports Science Skills Exam consists of medical tests and physical fitness.
 The Skills Exam can be followed at the nearest state university who has the selected course. A complete list of state universities which provide skills exam can be viewed on the page.

Portfolio 
Is a portfolio of ability/talent needed in order to apply for select study programs, submitted upon registration of SBMPTN which consists of ten (10) categories:

 Sports
 Fine arts, design, and craft
 Dance
 Theatre
 Music
 Karawitan (Javanese music)
 Ethnomusicology
 Photography
 Film and television
 Pedalangan (traditional puppetry)

References

External links 
 LTMPT official website

Standardized tests
Education in Indonesia